Call For Music is a Canadian music variety television series which aired on CBC Television from 1957 to 1958.

Premise
Bert Nelson hosted this Vancouver-produced variety series. Guests included Pat Suzuki who appeared on two episodes. The house orchestra was led by Ricky Hyslop.

Scheduling
This half-hour series was broadcast on alternate Tuesdays at 10:00 p.m. (Eastern) from 12 November 1957 to 4 February 1958. The Concert Hour was broadcast on other weeks.

References

External links
 

CBC Television original programming
1957 Canadian television series debuts
1958 Canadian television series endings
1950s Canadian music television series
Black-and-white Canadian television shows